Arth-Goldau railway station is a railway station in the Swiss canton of Schwyz and municipality of Arth. The station is located in the centre of the village of Goldau, which forms part of Arth.

The station is a keilbahnhof. It is an important junction, where the Zug–Arth-Goldau line joins the main line of the Gotthard line, and also where the Südostbahn-owned Pfäffikon–Arth-Goldau line diverges. The station has six platforms: three on the Gotthard line toward  and three on the Zug–Arth-Goldau line toward . Additionally, the Arth–Rigi Railway terminates in its own platforms above and at right angles to the main platforms.

Services 
 the following services stop at Arth-Goldau:

 EuroCity / InterCity / InterRegio / Voralpen Express:
 Hourly service over the Gotthard line to Lugano via Erstfeld.
 Hourly service over the Pfäffikon–Arth-Goldau line to St. Gallen.
 Half-hourly service over the Thalwil–Arth-Goldau line to Zürich.
 Hourly service over the Gotthard line to Basel SBB.
 Half-hourly service over the Gotthard railway to Lucerne.
 Lucerne S-Bahn:
 Gotthard Panorama Express: daily tourist oriented service to Lugano via the original high level Gotthard tunnel, with connecting boat service on Lake Lucerne to Lucerne.

References

External links 
 
 

Railway stations in Switzerland opened in 1876
Buildings and structures in the canton of Schwyz
Railway stations in the canton of Schwyz
Swiss Federal Railways stations